Eduardo Correia Piller Filho, or simply Eduardo Ratinho, (born 17 September 1987) is a Brazilian former footballer who played as a right back. Eduardo Ratinho was known for his speed, technique, dribbling skills and free kick ability.

Career
Eduardo Ratinho made his Corinthians debut on 17 August 2005 in a 2-0 victory over Goiás, for the Campeonato Brasileiro Série A. In 2007, he was loaned to Russian club CSKA Moscow. In January 2008, Eduardo Ratinho signed with French club Toulouse FC. Seven months later, Eduardo Ratinho was then loaned by Toulouse to Fluminense for the 2008 Campeonato Brasileiro Série A.

National team
Eduardo has been capped at Under-20 level and was named in the Brazilian 2007 U-20 World Cup squad for the FIFA U-20 World Cup.

Honours
 Corinthians
Brazilian Série A: 2005.
 Campeonato Pernambucano in 2010 with Sport Recife

References

External links
Guardian Stats Centre
 CBF

1987 births
Living people
Brazilian footballers
Brazil youth international footballers
Brazil under-20 international footballers
Brazilian expatriate footballers
Campeonato Brasileiro Série A players
Sport Club Corinthians Paulista players
PFC CSKA Moscow players
Toulouse FC players
Fluminense FC players
Botafogo Futebol Clube (SP) players
Grêmio Osasco Audax Esporte Clube players
Footballers from São Paulo
Russian Premier League players
Expatriate footballers in France
Expatriate footballers in Russia
Association football defenders